Aberdeen was launched at Aberdeen in 1801. She spent much of her career as a West Indiaman, though she made voyages elsewhere, and was for a time a London-based transport. Her crew abandoned her at sea in December 1815.

Career
Aberdeen first appeared in Lloyd's Register (LR) in 1801 with Gibbon, master and owner, and trade Liverpool–St Kitts. In 1805 her trade was Liverpool–Jamaica.

On 21 April 1807 Lloyd's List (LL) reported that Aberdeen, Fraser, master, had put into Port Antonio on 28 January because she was leaky. She had to unload to effect repairs. She arrived at Gravesend on 19 July.

LR for 1816 showed Aberdeen with J. Fraser, master, Gibbon, owner, and trade Liverpool–Philadelphia.

Fate
Her crew abandoned Aberdeen, Fraser, master, on 10 December 1815 in the Atlantic Ocean with seven feet of water in her hold. She was on a voyage from Liverpool to Philadelphia, Pennsylvania.

Citations

1801 ships
Ships built in Aberdeen
Age of Sail merchant ships of England
Maritime incidents in 1815